The Historic Toy Museum in Freinsheim (Historisches Spielzeugmuseum Freinsheim) in Germany is a private collection of old toys.

Exhibition

The exhibits date from the time of the Industrial Revolution around 1890 to the Second World War. Most of them are products by the firm of Bing in Nuremberg (Bing Werke Nürnberg). The museum curator is Marion Groll. The collection by Uwe Groll was the basis for the private museum opened on 2 April 2011. This collection originally concentrated on model railways and accessories of 0 Gauge from the House of Bing. Over the course of years Groll became so fascinated by the firm’s history and the variety of their products, that the collection  grew ever wider.

Themes

The collection comprises about 1,000 exhibits covering various lines from Bing’s range of products. They were made before 1932 and are mostly in their original condition:

 Model railways (steam, clockwork, electric) and railway stations
 Steam engines, motorised models
 Cars, boats, planes
 Bears, dolls, soft toys
 Doll's kitchens, doll's houses and their accessories
 Board games and party games, playing cards
 Cinematographs, children's gramophones, Bingola
 Children’s books, brochures, catalogues, advertising material
 Physical and technical educational products
 Typewriters, cameras, irons
 Household items (enamel, copper, Jugendstil)
 Refrigerators, ovens
 Model soldiers, table lamps

Haus an der Bach 
The museum building, the "House by the Stream" (Haus an der Bach) originally went back to the Middle Ages and was renovated as a listed building. It lies opposite the Four-Pipe Well (Vier-Röhren-Brunnen) a former Eichbrunnen for the barrels of the vintner. The house has 3 storeys and a usable area of 300m² for exhibitions and the museum café.

External links 
 Museum website

Toy museums
Museums in Rhineland-Palatinate
Buildings and structures in Bad Dürkheim (district)

de:Historisches Spielzeugmuseum Freinsheim